Kelvin Palmer (born October 23, 1990) is a professional gridiron football offensive tackle who is a free agent. He played for the Edmonton Eskimos, BC Lions and Hamilton Tiger-Cats of the Canadian Football League (CFL). Palmer played college football at Baylor University.

Professional career

Palmer was placed on injured reserve by the Houston Roughnecks on February 17, 2020. He had his contract terminated when the league suspended operations on April 10, 2020.

References

External links
Hamilton Tiger-Cats bio

1990 births
Living people
American football offensive tackles
Baylor Bears football players
Arizona Cardinals players
Pittsburgh Steelers players
Tampa Bay Buccaneers players
Players of American football from Dallas
Players of Canadian football from Dallas
BC Lions players
Hamilton Tiger-Cats players
Canadian football offensive linemen
Houston Roughnecks players